HMS H9 was a British H-class submarine built by the Canadian Vickers Co., Montreal. She was laid down on an unknown date and commissioned in June 1915. Launched by J. Grace Gardner at Montréal on 22 May 1915 (according to the ship's bell).

HMS H9 was sold on 30 November 1921 in Malta.

Design

H9 was fitted with a  Hotchkiss quick-firing gun (6-pounder) and four  torpedo tubes. Its torpedo tubes were fitted to the bows and the submarine was loaded with eight  torpedoes. It is a Holland 602 type submarine but was designed to meet Royal Navy specifications. Its complement was twenty-two crew members.

References

Bibliography
 

 

British H-class submarines
Ships built in Quebec
1915 ships
World War I submarines of the United Kingdom
Royal Navy ship names